Baumea vaginalis, commonly known as sheath twig rush, is a flowering plant in the sedge family, Cyperaceae, that is native to Western Australia.

It blooms between October and November producing brown flowers.

It found in wet depressions and swamps and on the margins of lakes and creeks along coastal areas in the Peel, South West and Great Southern regions where it grows in dark brown sandy soils.

References

vaginalis
Plants described in 1969
Flora of Western Australia